Campo Calabro is a comune (municipality) in the Province of Reggio Calabria in the Italian region Calabria, located about  southwest of Catanzaro and about  north of Reggio Calabria.

Campo Calabro borders the following municipalities: Fiumara, Reggio Calabria, Villa San Giovanni.

Demographic evolution

References

External links
 www.comune.campocalabro.rc.it/

Cities and towns in Calabria